This is a list of the stories in Pavel Bazhov's collection The Malachite Box. The first edition, released on 28 January 1939, consisted of 14 stories, based on the oral lore of the miners and gold prospectors. After the initial publication, the author continuously added new stories to the collection.

Key

Chronological list

References

Sources 
 
 
 
 
 

Malachite Box
The Malachite Box short stories